The Peninsula Bangkok is a 5-star hotel in Bangkok, Thailand.  The hotel opened in 1998, counting 37 floors and 367 rooms. The hotel was 50% owned by the Hongkong and Shanghai Hotels (HSH) and 50% by the Phataraprasit family until 2020, when HSH purchased the Phataraprasit family's stake in the property.

In popular culture
In the novel Snakehead by Anthony Horowitz, Alex Rider, the main character stays in this hotel while he is in Bangkok.

See also
List of tallest buildings in Thailand
The Peninsula New York
The Peninsula Hong Kong
The Peninsula Manila
The Peninsula Chicago

References 

Hotels in Bangkok
Bangkok
Hotel buildings completed in 1998
Hotels established in 1998
1998 establishments in Thailand
Skyscraper hotels in Thailand
Buildings and structures on the Chao Phraya River